Ak Tap is a village located on the road from Kunda Gazar to Hazrat Imam. It is about 10 miles from Hazrat Imam, and, as of the turn of the twentieth century, housed 25 Uzbek families.

See also
Kunduz Province

References

Populated places in Kunduz Province